Gancarczyk is a surname. Notable people with the surname include:

Janusz Gancarczyk (born 1984), Polish footballer, brother of Marek
Marek Gancarczyk (born 1983), Polish footballer
Mariusz Gancarczyk (born 1988), Polish footballer
Seweryn Gancarczyk (born 1981), Polish footballer

Polish-language surnames